Suyima G'anieva (1932-2018) was a Soviet and Uzbek literary scholar, a professor, and a Hero of Uzbekistan (2015).

Early life and education 
Suyima G'anieva was born in Tashkent to an family of workers. She engaged in the study of Uzbek classical literature. G'anieva graduated from the Faculty of Oriental Studies of the Central Asian State University (1952) and postgraduate studies at the Leningrad State University (1953-1956). In 1956 G'anieva defended her thesis on the work of Alisher Navoi.

Career 
Since 1956  G'anieva has been a junior researcher at the Institute of Language and Literature of the Academy of Sciences of Uzbekistan. Subsequently, she was a scientific secretary of the Institute of Language and Literature of the Academy of Sciences of Uzbekistan, head chair at the Tashkent State Conservatory, and professor at the Tashkent State Institute of Oriental Studies.

G'anieva found and published the work of Alisher Navoi Munojot, which remained unknown to science for many years.

G'anieva is an author of fundamental research on Uzbek classical literature and its role in world culture, and an author of 14 monographs, more than 350 scientific and theoretical articles, and more than 20 teaching manuals.

Works 

 "Life and work of Alisher Navoi"
 "The ideas of humanism in the work of Alisher Navoi"
 "Motives of nobility in the gazelles of Navoi"
 "Testament of Navoi"
 "Autograph of Navoi"

Awards 
G'anieva is a laureate of the State Prize of the Republic of Uzbekistan, awarded with the orders El-yurt khurmati (1999) and Order of Outstanding Merit (2008). In 2015 she was awarded the title of Hero of Uzbekistan.

Commemoration 
The documentary film "The Way" is dedicated to the scientific work and creative life of Suyima G'anieva.

References 

1932 births
2018 deaths
Uzbekistani women scientists
Women literary critics
People from Tashkent